The 2015 Spanish motorcycle Grand Prix was the fourth round of the 2015 Grand Prix motorcycle racing season. It was held at the Circuito de Jerez in Jerez de la Frontera on 3 May 2015.

In the premier class, Jorge Lorenzo took his first pole position since the 2014 San Marino Grand Prix, and ultimately his first victory at Circuito de Jerez since 2011. Marc Márquez, despite riding with a fractured finger on his left hand after a dirt-track accident a week before the race, finished in second while Valentino Rossi recorded his eighth successive podium finish – and the 200th of his Grand Prix career – with third place. Further down the order, Ducati's Andrea Dovizioso started from eighth on the grid, but he went off track on the second lap. After he fell to the rear of the field, Dovizioso was able to finish ninth, just behind Bradley Smith. Dovizioso's teammate, Andrea Iannone, had a good start position, third on the grid, but he fell to sixth place.

Classification

MotoGP

Moto2

Moto3

Championship standings after the race (MotoGP)
Below are the standings for the top six riders and constructors after round four has concluded.

Riders' Championship standings

Constructors' Championship standings

Teams' Championship standings

 Note: Only the top six positions are included for both sets of standings.

References

Spanish
Motorcycle Grand Prix
Spanish motorcycle Grand Prix
Spanish motorcycle Grand Prix